Georg Händel (Halle, Archbishopric of Magdeburg, 24 September 1622 – Halle, Duchy of Magdeburg, 11 February 1697) was a barber-surgeon and the father of Georg Frideric Handel.

Parents and early life
Händel's father, Valentin Händel (1582–1636), was a coppersmith, from Breslau (present day Wrocław). In 1607 he married Anna Belching (1589–1670), the daughter of a master coppersmith in Eisleben. Both were Protestants (Eisleben was the hometown of Martin Luther), as was Breslau, even though Silesia was a Habsburg possession. The couple decided to emigrate in 1608 to Halle, in reliably Lutheran Saxony. Georg was the sixth child of Valentin and Anna, born in 1622 in the Neumarkt section of Halle.

Valentin became a respected citizen of the city. The 1697 inscription on the vault Georg Händel purchased in 1674 refers to his father as "Councillor," presumably a member of the city council of Halle. Georg's two older brothers, Valentin and Christoph, learned their father's trade. The Thirty Years' War, however, was extremely destructive to Halle, and Georg's father died of the plague when Georg was 14. the prospect of education beyond Halle's Luthern Gymnasium was impossible.

Händel's apprenticeship as a barber-surgeon

After his father's death in 1636, Georg took up studies with the town surgeon-barber, Andreas Beger, who in 1618 had married the daughter of the English musician, William Brade, the court kapellmeister at Halle. In 1643 before he reached the age of 21 he married Anna née Katte, the recent widow of another barber, Christoph Oettinger, although she was 12 years his senior. As a result, Georg was entitled to the freedom of the town. In 1645 Georg Handel was appointed town surgeon (Amts-chirurgus) of Giebichenstein, a suburb of Halle of some importance. In 1660 Augustus, Duke of Saxe-Weissenfels conferred on him the titles of Kammerdiener (court valet) and Leibchirurgus (surgeon), which titles were confirmed on the Duke's death by the Elector of Brandenburg who also added the prefix Kurbrandenburgische making the appointments applicable to Brandenburg as well.

Family
Georg had six children with his first wife: Dorothea Elisabet, Gottfried, Christoph, Anna Barbara, Karl, Sophia Rosina. The couple lived in a village called Neumarkt, south of Saalkreis. In 1666 he bought a tavern The Yellow Deer. In 1672 he was given a license to serve wine, and also owned a vineyard outside the city walls. His wife died in 1682; the next year he married Dorothea Taust (1651–1730), the daughter of a Lutheran pastor in Giebichenstein. In 1685 George Friedrich Handel was born, followed by sisters Dorothea Sophia in 1687 and Johanna Christiana in 1690 (she died in 1709).

According to John Mainwaring, Handel's first biographer, "Handel had discovered such a strong propensity to Music, that his father who always intended him for the study of the Civil Law, had reason to be alarmed. He strictly forbade him to meddle with any musical instrument but Handel found means to get a little clavichord privately convey'd to a room at the top of the house. To this room he constantly stole when the family was asleep". One day Handel and his father went on a trip to Weissenfels to visit either his son (Handel's half-brother) Karl, or grandson (Handel's nephew) Georg Christian  who was serving as a valet to Duke Johann Adolf I. According to legend, the young Handel attracted the attention of the Duke with his playing on the church organ. At his urging, Handel's father permitted him to take lessons in musical composition and keyboard technique from Friedrich Wilhelm Zachow, the organist of the Lutheran Marienkirche.

Notes

Sources
 
  
 
 

1622 births
1697 deaths